Northumberlandia (the "Lady of the North") is a huge land sculpture in the shape of a reclining female figure, which was completed in 2012, near Cramlington, Northumberland, northern England.

Its creators claim that it is the largest land sculpture in female form in the world.

It is intended to be a major tourist attraction, with the developers hoping that it will attract an additional 200,000 visitors a year to Northumberland. It was officially opened by Anne, Princess Royal on 29 August 2012. A day-long Community Opening Event on 20 October 2012 marked the park becoming fully open to the public.

Development 

Designed by American landscape architect Charles Jencks,
the sculpture was built on the Blagdon Estate, owned by Matt Ridley, a journalist, businessman and author of The Red Queen: Sex and the Evolution of Human Nature.

The £2.5 million cost was borne by the Blagdon Estate and the Banks Group, who carried out the construction work. The construction is part of the development of an adjacent open-cast coal mine at Shotton. For this project, it was decided to use part of the excavated material to make a land sculpture rather than return it all to the surface mine, as is normally done at the end of such operations.

See also 
 Sleeping Lady

References

External links 

 
 In pictures: Northumberlandia - the reclining lady, BBC, 30 August 2012
 Banks Group – Shotten/Northumberlandia
 Satellite view

Landscape architecture
Outdoor sculptures in England
Monuments and memorials in Northumberland
Land art
Geoglyphs
Sculptures of women in the United Kingdom
Cramlington